Avenue B may refer to:

 Avenue B (album), by Iggy Pop
 Avenue B (Brooklyn), in  Canarsie, Brooklyn, New York City
 Avenue B (Manhattan), in the Alphabet City area of  East Village, Manhattan, New York City

See also
B Street (disambiguation)